Mindfulness, formerly Breathe, is a watch application developed by Apple Inc., first introduced with the release of WatchOS 3. The app intends to remind users to practice mindfulness through simple guided meditation, in which a number of overlapping blue circles expand and shrink several times within a minute. 
The user is instructed to take deep breaths in while the circles grow, exhaling as they return to their original size. At the end of a session, the user's current heart rate is shown alongside the number of "mindfulness minutes" completed for the day, which can also be seen in the Health and Fitness apps on a linked iPhone device. A breathe watch face is also available in classic, calm, and focus options.

With watchOS 8, the Mindfulness app was expanded upon to include a "reflect" mode, which provides users with a prompt or question to think about over a minute period. While completing a reflect activity, the watch displays a screen which cycles through different colors in motion.

References 

WatchOS software
Health software
IOS-based software made by Apple Inc.
Mindfulness (psychology)
Fitness apps